Xantolis is a genus of trees and shrubs in the family Sapotaceae described as a genus in 1838.

Xantolis is native to Asia (India to southern China to Singapore and the Philippines.

Species

References

Chrysophylloideae
Sapotaceae genera